Mark Jared Banasiak is an Australian politician. He has been a member of the New South Wales Legislative Council since 2019, representing the Shooters, Fishers and Farmers Party.

Banasiak was president of the Sporting Shooters Association before his election. He defeated sitting MLC Robert Brown for preselection to lead the Shooters, Fishers and Farmers Party ticket prior to the 2019 New South Wales state election.

References

 

Year of birth missing (living people)
Living people
Members of the New South Wales Legislative Council
Shooters, Fishers and Farmers Party politicians
21st-century Australian politicians